Zakariah Barie (born 29 May 1953) is a retired Tanzanian long-distance runner who specialized in the 10,000 metres.

He won the silver medal at the 1982 Commonwealth Games, finished thirteenth at the 1984 Olympic Games. He also competed at the 1980 Olympic Games and the 1983 World Championships without reaching the final.

He studied at the University of Texas at El Paso.

External links
 

1953 births
Living people
Tanzanian male long-distance runners
Athletes (track and field) at the 1982 Commonwealth Games
Athletes (track and field) at the 1980 Summer Olympics
Athletes (track and field) at the 1984 Summer Olympics
Olympic athletes of Tanzania
Commonwealth Games silver medallists for Tanzania
Commonwealth Games medallists in athletics
World Athletics Championships athletes for Tanzania
University of Texas at El Paso alumni
UTEP Miners men's track and field athletes
Medallists at the 1982 Commonwealth Games